The Christian Democratic Voice (CDV) is a political party in Namibia. It was launched in 2014 and has about 8,000 members.

Political position
The Christian Democratic Voice has its main backing in pentecostal and charismatic Christians. The CDV demand "that Namibia be declared a Christian state" and endorses that "spiritual leaders" are needed in parliament to keep the balance of power in Namibia.

Pentecostal and Charismatic sects in Namibia are accused of exploiting desperate members of the Namibian society. General-secretary Faustus Thomas, although admitting certain problems among these groups, rejects a control of these organizations and insisted that they be given time to regulate themselves.

The party calls itself the only pro-life party in Namibia.

Electoral history

2019 general election 
For the 2019 Namibian general election the party formed a coalition with the Rally for Democracy and Progress. The CDV did not file an own candidate for the presidency.

National Assembly elections

References

Political parties established in 2014
2014 establishments in Namibia
Political parties in Namibia
Christian fundamentalism
Christian political parties
Protestant political parties